In organic chemistry, methylenation is a chemical reaction that inserts a methylene group into a chemical compound:

Typically, the reaction is used to prepare terminal alkenes from aldehydes and, less frequently, ketones.

Methods

Methylene-for-oxo reactions
A common method for methylenation involves the Wittig reaction using methylenetriphenylphosphorane with an aldehyde (Ph = phenyl):
RCHO + Ph3P=CH2 -> RCH=CH2 + Ph3PO

A related reaction can be accomplished with Tebbe's reagent, which is sufficiently versatile to allow methylenation of esters:
RCO2R' + Cp2Ti(Cl)CH2AlMe2 -> RC(OR')=CH2 + Cp2TiOAlMe2Cl
Other less well-defined titanium reagents, e.g., Lombardo's reagent, effect similar transformations.

Carbanions derived from methylsulfones have also been employed, equivalently to the Wittig reaction.

Other approaches
Ethenolysis is a method for methylenation of internal alkene as illustrated by the following example:

References

Carbon-carbon bond forming reactions